Manina is a 1942 German-language operetta by Nico Dostal to a libretto by Hans Adler and Alexander Lix. It was premiered 28 November 1942 at the Admiralspalast in Berlin.

Recording 
Hedi Klug, Peter Minich, Else Rambausek, Fritz Muliar, Orchester des Österreichischen Rundfunks, Rudolf Bibl 1961

References 

1942 operas
Operas by Nico Dostal
Operas
German-language operettas